Staroye Ratovo is a rural locality (a village) in Kovarditskoye Rural Settlement, Muromsky District, Vladimir Oblast, Russia. The population was 139 as of 2010. There are 4 streets.

Geography 
Staroye Ratovo is located 14 km southwest of Murom (the district's administrative centre) by road. Krivitsy is the nearest rural locality.

References 

Rural localities in Muromsky District